Total Devo is the seventh studio album by American new wave band Devo, released on May 24, 1988 by Enigma Records, just under four years after their previous album, Shout (1984). "Disco Dancer" hit No. 45 on Billboards Hot Dance Club Play chart for the week of September 3, 1988.

Production
Total Devo was recorded between 1987 and 1988, with the basic tracks recorded at Devo studios, in Marina del Rey, and the additional tracks at Master Control, in Burbank, California.

The album was the first Devo studio album released after the departure of drummer Alan Myers, who was replaced by former Sparks and Gleaming Spires drummer David Kendrick. This was the last Devo album to include the use of the Fairlight CMI digital sampling synthesizer, which was mostly used for pre-sequencing the album and sampling in the choruses of "Some Things Never Change" and "Agitated".

Composition
"Some Things Never Change" contains a portion of lyrics from an earlier composition entitled "Some Things Don't Change", which was rejected from their previous album, Shout, and later appeared on the compilation album Recombo DNA in 2000. The song also paraphrases a lyric from the Beatles' "A Day in the Life" and appeared in Interplay's computer adventure game, Neuromancer, itself an adaptation of the 1984 novel of the same name by William Gibson.

"The Shadow" has lyrics that contain numerous references to literary works such as The Strange Case of Dr Jekyll and Mr Hyde. The chorus is partially lifted from T. S. Eliot's poem "The Hollow Men" and it incorporates and paraphrases the catchphrase from the serials following the character the Shadow ("Who knows what lurks in the hearts of men?/The shadow knows!").

Artwork and packaging
The cover photograph is based on an early promotional photo by Devo from 1977. For the silhouette photo on the back cover, the band members posed naked, in a spoof of Prince's Lovesexy album art. It is a common misconception that David Kendrick's chin on the front cover was taken from another photo and pasted on, having supposedly fallen behind Bob Casale's uniform; however, according to Kendrick, and based on alternate shots from the cover photo shoot, the "pasted-on" effect is simply due to the odd lighting from Kendrick's arm casting a shadow on his face.

The caption on the front cover has changed depending on the number of tracks contained in each release. The cover of the original vinyl release included the caption "11 digital cartoons from the de-evolution band," while the original CD release, which included two additional tracks, was captioned "13 digital cartoons from the de-evolution band." A cassette release was captioned "12 digital cartoons..." and the Restless Records re-release is captioned with "16 digital cartoons...". The 2018 Futurismo release simply says "Digital cartoons...".

Promotion
Two music videos were made for the album's second single, "Disco Dancer", both using remixed versions of the track by producer Ivan Ivan. Both videos are similar, but the 12-inch mix video has additional footage, including a topless woman, and was only on promotional VHS tapes distributed to nightclubs. According to Devo co-songwriter and bass guitarist Gerald Casale, the video for the 7-inch Mix failed to receive airplay after first being aired on MTV's "Smash or Trash?", in which a video was aired and viewers would call in and vote on it. The video was "trashed" and MTV refused to air it after that.

"Baby Doll" was used that same year in the comedy film Tapeheads, with newly recorded Swedish lyrics, and was credited to (and shown in a music video by) a fictitious Swedish band called Cube-Squared.

Total Devo was the only Devo album to be released on DAT in addition to the standard releases on vinyl, cassette and CD.

Reissue
In 2018, Futurismo Inc. issued a two-disc deluxe edition of Total Devo, on both CD and vinyl formats. The double CD set comes housed in a digipak while the double LP comes in three vinyl color variations. Both formats include gatefold sleeves with spot gloss logos and shapes, a fold-out poster and liner notes from band member Gerald Casale.

Critical reception

Village Voice critic Robert Christgau awarded the album a C+ grade, noting its "retro-electro sheen". Michael Azerrad of Rolling Stone magazine awarded the album one star out of five, dismissing it as "a desperate SOS from main writer Mark Mothersbaugh." Of "Baby Doll", Cash Box said, "this terribly unimaginative (by their standards) single is trying to be commercial."

In a retrospective review, Steve Huey of AllMusic said Total Devo found the band to be "no longer innovative and not incredibly compelling."

Track listing

 Track 11 not included on vinyl release of the album.
 Track 13 included on first CD version, DAT version, and subsequent CD releases. 1994 Restless Records CD reissue bonus tracks2018 Futurismo Inc. "Deluxe Edition" CD bonus discTracks 9–14 previously unreleased.

Personnel
Credits adapted from Pioneers Who Got Scalped: The Anthology CD liner notes:Devo Mark Mothersbaugh – vocals, keyboards, guitar
 Gerald Casale – vocals, bass guitar, keyboards
 Bob Mothersbaugh – lead guitar, vocals
 Bob Casale – rhythm guitar, keyboards, vocals
 David Kendrick – drums

Credits adapted from the original album's liner notes:Additional musicians Greta Greta – backing vocals on "Plain Truth"
 Nan Vernon – backing vocals on "Plain Truth"
 Steve Lindsay – bass sample on "Disco Dancer"Technical Devo – producer
 Bob Casale – engineer
 Ted Pattison – assistant engineer
 Gerald Casale – graphic concepts, art direction, World Service uniforms 
 Mark Mothersbaugh – graphic concepts, art direction, World Service uniforms
 Rocky Schenck – photography
 Robert Mothersbaugh – Amiga computer graphics
 Muto-little – uniform fabrication
 Patrick Pending – layout, design
 Jim Mothersbaugh – Roland equipment, technical collaboration

Tour
After a four-year hiatus, the Total Devo tour saw the band scaling things back considerably. The sets were very basic with no complex visuals and the band wore plain red shirts and pants, with the computer generated image of a smiling and frowning face (as featured on the artwork of the album) on the back of the shirts. These outfits were augmented by Energy domes as well as the "World Service" uniforms introduced at the time of release during certain parts of the show. The tour was commemorated on the 1989 album Now It Can Be Told.

On later dates in the tour, two songs from their next album Smooth Noodle Maps were added to the setlist: "Post Post-Modern Man" and "A Change Is Gonna Cum".

Tour setlistFirst Leg (1988–1989) "Jocko Homo (Sad Version)" 
 "It Doesn't Matter to Me" 
 "Going Under" 
 "Working in the Coal Mine" 
 "Happy Guy" 
 "That's Good" 
 "Jerkin' Back 'N' Forth" 
 "Pity You" 
 "Girl U Want" 
 "Whip It" 
 "Baby Doll" 
 "(I Can't Get No) Satisfaction" 
 "Uncontrollable Urge" 
 "Gut Feeling/Gates of Steel"
 "Beautiful World" 
 "Shout/Somewhere/Disco Dancer"Second Leg Onward (1989–1990)'''''

 "Going Under"
 "Happy Guy"
 "That's Good"
 "Jerkin' Back 'N' Forth"
 "Planet Earth"
 "Girl U Want"
 "Whip It"
 "Post-Post Modern Man"
 "A Change Is Gonna Cum"
 "(I Can't Get No) Satisfaction"
 "Uncontrollable Urge"
 "Mongoloid"
 "Gates Of Steel"
 "Jocko Homo"
 "Smart Patrol/Mr. DNA"
 "Gut Feeling"
"Come Back Jonee"
"Beautiful World"
 "Shout"
"Somewhere"
"Disco Dancer"

Chart performance

Weekly charts

References

External links

Devo albums
1988 albums
Enigma Records albums